"Losing Ground" is a song by Australian electronic music group, Groove Terminator. It was released in 1997 on 12" vinyl and in May 1998 on CD single. A remixed version is included on the band's debut studio album Road Kill. The song peaked at number 64 on the Australian ARIA Charts.

At the ARIA Music Awards of 1998, the song was nominated for ARIA Award for Best New Talent and ARIA Award for Best Video (Chris Bently).

Track listings
12" Vinyl (Interdance – ID 005)
 "Losing Ground" (Original mix) - 5:52
 "Losing Ground" (Johnny Lisbon remix) - 6:05
 "Losing Ground" (Coursey & Duane's Mirrorball remix) - 8:05
 "Losing Ground" (Code Warrior remix) - 6:27

CD single (Interdance – 724388518420)
 "Losing Ground" (Radio edit) - 3:27
 "Losing Ground" (Original mix) - 5:52
 "Losing Ground" (Coursey & Duane's Mirrorball remix) - 8:05
 "Losing Ground" (Johnny Lisbon remix) - 6:05
 "Losing Ground" (Code Warrior remix) - 6:27

Charts

References

1997 songs
1997 singles